Bartolome Alberto Mott (born October 1, 1987), known  professionally as Tom Rodriguez, is a Filipino-American model, actor, host and singer.

Biography
Rodriguez is from Catbalogan, Samar. He was born in Subic Naval Base in Zambales to an American serviceman father and a Filipina mother. One of six siblings, he moved with his two brothers and three sisters with their mother to Pinabacdao, Samar (where their mother hails from). But they grew up in nearby Catbalogan, also in Samar, where Rodriguez studied at St. Mary's College of Catbalogan (formerly Sacred Heart College) from kindergarten to elementary. They later migrated to the United States when he was 12 years old with his parents. He lived in Arizona and attended Cibola High School in Yuma. Then the family moved to San Francisco where he took up Digital Animation, but found it hard to find a job there. Rodriguez speaks English, Tagalog and Waray-Waray.

Career and acting
After his eviction from Pinoy Big Brother: Double Up, he signed under Star Magic and took the stage name Tom Rodriguez.  He made his television debut in Precious Hearts Romances Presents: My Cheating Heart.

In 2010, Rodriguez had a small role in an episode of Maalaala Mo Kaya with Angel Locsin. He and his fellow Pinoy Big Brother: Double Up housemates were cast in Your Songs summer episode Isla.  He later played the love interest of Valerie Concepcion in Precious Hearts Romances Presents:  Love Me Again. He also joined all male-singing group VoizBoys replacing Ronnie Liang, who was pulled out from the group because he has an existing contract to do an album as a solo artist. He made his film debut in Here Comes The Bride and later appeared in the film Petrang Kabayo.

Later in 2011, Rodriguez was cast in the remake film of Temptation Island in 1980 where he gained his fame, success and the key to him having a great career ahead of him. The movie was debuted in July 2011 and made it to the box office hitting 60 million. The movie were showered with numerous high ratings and excellent receptions from certain critics. Rodriguez's character pairing with GMA artist Marian Rivera played as one of the sexy and glamorous roles in the movie that had explicitly. He played the new version of Umberto that made him being one of the new twist in story from the old film as a server on an exclusive luxurious yacht shot in the beautiful scenic Manila Bay. Marian Rivera's character (Christina G.) played as the seductive girlfriend tempting Umberto later in the movie.

He recently played Simon Escalante in TV5's teen series  My Driver Sweet Lover. Rodriguez appeared in the ABS-CBN's hit drama series Angelito: Batang Ama as a regular. In the year 2012, he appeared in the movie The Reunion and in the hit daytime soap Be Careful with My Heart. He plays Jeff Macavinta as the father of Aiza Seguerras character, Cristina Rose's son, Pocholo.

In 2013, Rodriguez left Be Careful with My Heart then later played one of the leading roles in My Husband's Lover.

In 2014, he portrayed the role of Lucas Matthew Andrada in the television drama series My Destiny, opposite Carla Abellana, whom he first worked with in My Husband's Lover. That year, Rodriguez hostee the local franchise of the German game show Don't Lose the Money.

In 2015, Tom Rodriguez portrayed Sergio in the second Philippine adaptation of the hit Televisa Mexicanovela MariMar opposite Megan Young.

Theater
In 2012, Rodriguez played the titular character of Meralco Theater's Aladdin.

Filmography
Television
{| class="wikitable sortable" 
|- 
! Year
! Title
! Role
! class="unsortable" | Notes 
! class="unsortable" | Source 
|- 
| 2009
| Pinoy Big Brother: Double Up
| Himself / Housemate
| Forced eviction (Day 41)
| 
|-
| 2009
| Precious Hearts Romances Presents:  My Cheating Heart
| Harry
|
|
|-
| 2010
| Maalaala Mo Kaya
| Mike
| Episode: "Litrato" 
| 
|-
| 2010
| Your Song Presents: Isla
| Tom
|
|
|-
| 2010
| Precious Hearts Romances Presents:  Love Me Again
| Chadilton "Chad" Barrera
|
|
|-
| 2010
| M3: Malay Mo Ma-develop
| Ted Salazar
|
|
|-
| 2010-11
| My Driver Sweet Lover
| Simon Escalante
| 
| 
|-
| 2011
| Maalaala Mo Kaya
| Bong 
| Episode: "School ID"
| 
|-
| 2011
| Precious Hearts Romances Presents: Mana Po
| Johnny Santos
|
|
|-
| 2011
| Guns and Roses
| Young Lucio
|
|
|-
| 2011
| Maalaala Mo Kaya| Noli
| Episode: "Niagara Falls"
| 
|-
| 2011-2012
| Angelito: Batang Ama| Andrew Posadas
|
|
|-
| 2012
| Maalaala Mo Kaya| Chiz Escudero
| Episode: "Singsing"
|
|-
| 2012-2013
| Be Careful With My Heart| Jeff D. Macavinta
|
|
|-
| 2013
| Maalaala Mo Kaya| Ian
| Episode: "Palda"
|
|-
| 2013
|My Husband's Lover| Vicente "Vincent" Soriano
| 
|
|- 
| 2013
|Sunday All Stars| Host / Performer
|
|
|-
| 2014
|Niño| Gabriel Manalastas
|
|
|-
| 2014
| My Destiny  
| Lucas Matthew Andrada
|
|
|-
| 2014
| Don't Lose the Money  
| Host
|
| 
|-
| 2015-2016
| MariMar 
| Sergio Santibañez
|
| 
|-
| 2015-2016
| Ismol Family| Mac-Mac
|
|
|-
| 2015-2016
| Celebrity Bluff 
| Host 
|
|
|-
|  2016 
| Asia's Next Top Model Cycle 4| Guest
| 
|
|-
| 2016
| Karelasyon| 
|
|
|-
| 2016
| Dear Uge| Mark
|
|
|-
| 2016-2017
| Someone to Watch Over Me 
| Teodoro Jose "TJ" Chavez
|
|
|-
| 2017
| Mulawin vs. Ravena| Rodrigo
|
|
|-
| 2017
| I Heart Davao| Ponce Torres
|
|
|-
| 2018
| The Cure| Gregory "Greg" Salvador
|
|
|-
| 2019
| Dragon Lady| Michael Chan
|
|
|-
| 2020
| Love of My Life| Stefano Gonzales
|
|
|-
| 2020
| I Can See You| Luisito "Luis" Alvarez
|
|
|-
| 2021-2022
| The World Between Us| Brian Libradilla / Brian Delgado
|
|
|-
|}

Film

 Discography 
Studio albumsVoizBoys TomDen'''

Accolades

References

External links

1987 births
Living people
Filipino people of American descent
Pinoy Big Brother contestants
People from Catbalogan
People from Zambales
Filipino male models
Male models from Arizona
21st-century Filipino male singers
American male actors of Filipino descent
Singers from Arizona
ABS-CBN personalities
Star Magic
GMA Network personalities
GMA Music artists
Filipino male musical theatre actors
Filipino television variety show hosts